is the pen name of a Japanese author who has published over 100 light novel volumes. He is best known for the creation of the A Certain Magical Index franchise which, as of 2019, has sold over 30 million copies worldwide and has been licensed in North America by Yen Press with the first novel being released in Q4 2014.

Career 
Kazuma Kamachi has stated that ever since he was a child, he had always wanted to become a novelist, spending his student days in trying to achieve this dream. However, his intention was never to become a popular writer. From the time he was in junior high school, bit-by-bit he started writing, but it was not until he graduated from high school that he ever completed any of his work.

Kamachi submitted his novel Schrödinger's Machi (シュレディンガーの街) to the 9th Dengeki Game Novel Prize, but it was rejected in the third round. Despite this, his work caught the attention of editor-in-charge of the award, Kazuma Miki, who offered him a chance to write another work. For around a year, Kamachi exchanged and discussed prototype stories with Miki, and made his debut with A Certain Magical Index in April 2004 after 6 or 7 revisions. The initial volume was written as a complete story in case that it would not sell, however after selling well, it was decided that it would become a series. A Certain Magical Index would soon be adapted to a manga, then to an anime, a movie, games, etc. turning into an extremely popular franchise. This, in turn, led to the series breaking many Dengeki Bunko, the series' publisher, records, such as being the first series to have 1, 2, and then 3 million copies in circulation. In April 2016, Kamachi signed a contract to write for Kazuma Miki's new company Straight Edge Inc. On July 10, 2020, he became the first Dengeki writer to have published 100 volumes under their label.

He states that many of his pre-debut works, including the prototypes he sent to Miki, remains stored away at his house.

Personal life
Not much is known about Kazuma Kamachi's personal life, which is also true for other light novel authors in Japan. As an author, he is known for his consistent output in writing his books, releasing at least 3 per year. Starting in December 2014, Kazuma has been releasing novels monthly in 4 different titles while working on 3 different manga titles.

Kazuma Miki, editor of the A Certain Magical Index series, released a book and a chapter named Kamachi Kazuma the Legend confirms/debunks rumors about him and talks about him.

Works

Novels

Manga

Film

Video games

Awards
 Kono Light Novel ga Sugoi!
 2009 - 4th Place in Best Novel Series, A Certain Magical Index
 2010 - 9th Place in Best Novel Series, A Certain Magical Index
 2011 - 1st Place in Best Novel Series, A Certain Magical Index
 2012 - 2nd Place in Best Novel Series, A Certain Magical Index
 2013 - 2nd Place in Best Novel Series, A Certain Magical Index
 2014 - 3rd Place in Best Novel Series, A Certain Magical Index
 2015 - 4th Place in Best Novel Series, A Certain Magical Index
 2016 - 7th Place in Best Novel Series, A Certain Magical Index
 2017 - 3rd Place in Best Novel Series, A Certain Magical Index
 2019 - 9th Place in Best Novel Series, A Certain Magical Index

References

External links

  Kazuma Kamachi 10 Year Anniversary official website 
 

21st-century Japanese novelists
Light novelists
Living people
Unidentified people
Year of birth missing (living people)
21st-century pseudonymous writers